The Best of Blancmange (1996) is a compilation of singles, album and non album tracks from the English musical group Blancmange

Track listing
All songs written by Neil Arthur & Stephen Luscombe, except where noted.

CD:  VSOP CD226
 "God's Kitchen" – 2:55
 "I've Seen the Word" – 3:05
 "Feel Me" – 5:04
 "Living on the Ceiling" – 4:00
 "Running Thin" – 2:21
 "I Can't Explain" – 4:02
 "Waves" – 4:10
 "Blind Vision" – 4:00
 "That's Love, That It Is" – 4:19
 "Vishnu" – 5:17
 "Don't Tell Me" – 3:32
 "Get Out of That" – 4:24
 "The Day Before You Came" (Andersson/Ulvaeus) – 4:27
 "All Things Are Nice (Version)" – 4:13
 "What's Your Problem" – 4:10
 "Lose Your Love" – 4:07
 "I Can See It" – 4:08

References

1996 greatest hits albums
Blancmange (band) compilation albums